Events from the year 1983 in Scotland.

Incumbents 

 Secretary of State for Scotland and Keeper of the Great Seal – George Younger

Law officers 
 Lord Advocate – Lord Mackay of Clashfern
 Solicitor General for Scotland – Peter Fraser

Judiciary 
 Lord President of the Court of Session and Lord Justice General – Lord Emslie
 Lord Justice Clerk – Lord Wheatley
 Chairman of the Scottish Land Court – Lord Elliott

Events 
 11 May – Aberdeen F.C. beat Real Madrid 2–1 (after extra time) to win the European Cup Winner's Cup.
 21 May – Aberdeen beat Rangers 1-0 to win the Scottish Cup.
 30 September – Megget Reservoir officially opened.
 5 October – Harviestoun Brewery established.
 24 October – Dennis Nilsen goes on trial at the Central Criminal Court in London accused of six murders and two attempted murders. He confesses to murdering "15 or 16" young men.
 4 November – Dennis Nilsen is sentenced to life imprisonment.
 20 December – Aberdeen beat European Cup Winners Hamburg 2-0 to become the first Scottish club to win the UEFA Super Cup.
 Brae oilfield production begins.
 Glasgow Central Mosque built.

Births 
 1 January – Mark Beaumont, adventurer
 27 January – Douglas Ross, Conservative politician
 8 February – Ashley Mulheron, actress and television presenter
 14 March – Anas Sarwar, Labour politician
 15 March – Sean Biggerstaff, actor
 8 June – Allan Dick, field hockey goalkeeper
 22 August – Julie Kilpatrick, field hockey player
 20 September – Freya Ross, née Murray, long-distance runner
 30 September – Louise Munn, field hockey defender

Deaths 
 27 April – Christina Larner, historian (born 1933 in England)
 5 July – Alec Cheyne, international footballer (born 1907)
 August – Winifred Rushforth, psychoanalyst (born 1885)
 26 August – Major-General Douglas Wimberley, soldier (born 1896)
 20 September – Andy Beattie, international footballer and manager (born 1913)

The arts
 17 February – release of Bill Forsyth's film Local Hero.
 6 September – ITV broadcasts the Scottish Television-produced police procedural Killer, set in Glasgow, pilot for the series Taggart.
 21 October – Burrell Collection opened in Glasgow.
Alternative rock band Del Amitri is formed in Glasgow.
Alternative rock band The Jesus and Mary Chain is formed in East Kilbride.
Folk rock band The Proclaimers is formed by twins Craig and Charlie Reid of Auchtermuchty.
Gael Turnbull publishes his poems From the Language of the Heart: Some Imitations from the Gaelic of Sine Reisideach in Glasgow.

See also 
 1983 in Northern Ireland

References 

 
Scotland
Years of the 20th century in Scotland
1980s in Scotland